Mikhail Olegovich Yefremov (born 10 November 1963) is a Russian film and stage actor, Meritorious Artist of Russian Federation (1995).

Life and career
Mikhail is the son of People's Artist of the USSR Oleg Yefremov and Sovremennik Theatre actor Professor Alla Pokrovskaya (Boris Pokrovsky's daughter). He made his stage and screen debut in mid 1970s as schoolboy. In 1982-1984 Yefremov served in Soviet Army. In 1987 he graduated from the Moscow Art Theatre School.

Yefremov was married four times and he has six children. His first wife was the editor Asya Vorobieva, their son Nikita is a Sovremennik Theatre actor. His second wife was the actress Yevgenia Dobrovolskaya, their son Nikolay is also an actor. His third wife was actress Kseniya Kachalina, they have a son Sergey. His fourth wife is audio engineer Sofiya Kruglikova, they have daughters Vera and Nadezhda, and son Boris.

In 2009-2014, Yefremov presented Channel One show Wait for Me, dedicated to search of long lost relatives and friends.

In 2010's he collaborated with Dmitry Bykov on their project "Citizen Poet" (a pun on Nikolai Nekrasov's poem "Poet and Citizen"). Yefremov read poems, written by Bykov, which are usually satirical comments on the contemporary Russian society, politics and culture. Each poem parodies the style of a famous poet of the past, e.g. Pushkin, Nekrasov, Kipling, among others. It was originally broadcast on Dozhd TV channel, but the original project was closed because the poems were too critical towards the Russian government. Currently, the show is hosted in audio format by Echo of Moscow radio station.

On 8 June 2020, Yefremov was involved in a head-on collision while driving under the influence of alcohol. The driver of the other car died in the hospital. A video of Yefremov speaking to the police in a slurred manner after the accident was widely published. The accident affected Yefremov's health, causing him to suffer an ischemic stroke during court proceedings. On September 8, 2020, Yefremov was sentenced to 8 years in a medium-security prison, as well as obligated to pay 800,000 rubles (around $10,000) in restitution to the family of the deceased driver. His lawyer, Elman Pashaev, has been banned from practicing law for one year. On appeal, Yefremov's sentence was reduced to 7.5 years.

Prior to the incident, Yefremov was set to star in the Russian detective/fantasy series Vampiry Sredney Polosy (Вампиры средней полосы, Vampires of Central Russia). Afterwards, the entire series was redone with actor Yuri Stoyanov and all traces of Yefremov's participation were wiped from the series.

Selected filmography

References

External links

1963 births
Male actors from Moscow
Living people
Soviet male child actors
Russian male child actors
Russian male film actors
Russian male stage actors
20th-century Russian male actors
21st-century Russian male actors
Russian television presenters
Honored Artists of the Russian Federation
State Prize of the Russian Federation laureates
Recipients of the Nika Award
TV Rain
Soviet male film actors
Soviet male stage actors
Echo of Moscow radio presenters
Moscow Art Theatre School alumni
Russian prisoners and detainees
Driving under the influence
People convicted of manslaughter